John Pope (fl. 1384–1397), from Gloucester, was an English politician.

He was a Member (MP) of the Parliament of England for Gloucester in November 1384, 1386, September 1388 and September 1397.

References

Year of birth missing
Year of death missing
14th-century English people
People from Gloucester
Members of the Parliament of England (pre-1707) for Gloucester